Ted Kelly (23 October 1869 – 6 September 1908) was a South African international rugby union player who played as a forward.

He made 1 appearance for South Africa against the British Lions in 1896.

References

South African rugby union players
South Africa international rugby union players
1869 births
1949 deaths
Rugby union forwards
Griquas (rugby union) players